Wristcutters: A Love Story is a 2006 comedy film written and directed by Goran Dukić. It stars Patrick Fugit, Shea Whigham, and Shannyn Sossamon as denizens of a strange afterlife way-station that has been reserved for people who committed suicide. It is based on Etgar Keret's short story "Kneller's Happy Campers." A graphic novel version was titled Pizzeria Kamikaze. The film was produced on an estimated budget of $1 million. It premiered at the 2006 Sundance Film Festival and was distributed in limited release on October 19, 2007, before being expanded into wide release on November 2, 2007. Lionsgate Home Entertainment released it on DVD on March 25, 2008. The film received positive reviews and has since garnered a cult following.

Plot
After Zia takes his own life, he finds himself in an afterlife limbo much the same as life, but slightly worse. The color is dim, there are no stars, and no one can smile. This strange realm is populated by people who have died by suicide, such as Eugene, a Russian musician who lives with his mother, father, and brother – all suicide victims. Together they waste most of their afterlives in bars, until Zia learns from a friend, Brian, that his ex-girlfriend, Desiree, took her own life shortly after Zia's death. He and Eugene take to the road to find her in Eugene's rundown car. Early on, it is revealed that Eugene's car has two idiosyncrasies, a black hole underneath the passenger seat where items that are dropped disappear forever, and broken headlights that cannot be fixed by even the most adept mechanics. On their trip, they pick up a hitchhiker, Mikal, who insists she has arrived by mistake, and is seeking the "people in charge" (a.k.a. the PIC) in order to be sent back.

After a few adventures across the countryside, as the trio journey along a desolate highway, Mikal pushes a button, miraculously activating the broken headlights on Eugene's car. Shortly thereafter, they come upon a man lying in the middle of the dark highway, forcing them to veer off the road in order to avoid hitting him and wrecking the car in the process.

They discover the man, Kneller, an eccentric commune leader, had fallen asleep while looking for his dog. Kneller invites them back to his camp, where they quickly discover that minor "miracles" occur, as long as the campers remain apathetic about the result. The group stays with the camp longer than intended, and Zia begins to obsess over the miracles and his inability to perform them. When contrasting this to Mikal's obsession with the people in charge, she reveals that her death was an accidental overdose. Eugene meets a young woman, Nanuk, whom he romances. Just as Mikal and Zia discuss their plans to leave Kneller's camp, another camper, Yan, emerges from the woods with news that Kneller's dog has been abducted by a cult leader called "Messiah King". Kneller, Zia, Mikal, and Yan set off in search of King and Kneller's dog.

The group soon find themselves lost and decide to make camp for the night. Unable to sleep, Mikal and Zia discover a nearby ocean shore, where they kiss and spend the night together. In the morning, Kneller discovers them lying among a seashore of used condoms and hypodermic needles. The group eventually reaches King's camp, where they discover that King is readying himself for a "real" miracle – to separate his soul from his body. As Kneller confronts King, Zia discovers that Desiree is a devout cult follower, having taken her own life for the purpose of following King into the afterlife.

As King is about to perform public, ritual suicide, Kneller reveals himself to be an undercover agent for the people in charge. King and Desiree are taken away, while Mikal leaves with them, promising Zia that she'll return. As Zia waits, Eugene and Nanuk arrive, explaining that Mikal has been returned to life and Kneller's camp has been shut down. They depart together on a train, giving Eugene's car to Zia. After finally performing a miracle – creating a star in the sky with a lit match next to one that Mikal had created earlier – Zia decides to take the car and wander. While he is turning over the cassette tape to place in the stereo it accidentally falls into the passenger side feet area. He reaches for it and enters the black hole under the car seat.

In a large warehouse filled with halls of boxes, Kneller picks up Zia's file from a box, places it into his inside breast pocket, and comments on how fortunate it is to know people in high places. Zia wakes up in a hospital bed. He turns his head, seeing his parents outside talking to doctors. When he looks at the person in the bed next to his, he sees Mikal. Both look at each other and smile.

Cast
 Patrick Fugit as Zia
 Shannyn Sossamon as Mikal
 Shea Whigham as Eugene
 Leslie Bibb as Desiree Randolph
 Tom Waits as Kneller
 Will Arnett as Messiah King
 Nick Offerman as Cop
 Mary Pat Gleason as Eugene's mother
 Anatol Rezmeritza as Eugene's father
 John Hawkes as Yan
 Jake Busey as Brian
 Mikal P. Lazarev as Nanuk
 Sarah Roemer as Rachel

Production 
The film was originally intended to be shot on super-16 color infrared film, which was produced specially by Kodak. The color-shifts inherent in using this kind of film were thought to enhance the parallel world feel to the action. In the end, it proved to be too time-consuming and the film was shot using normal filmstock manipulated in post-processing.

Music
Gogol Bordello's music is used throughout the film; the character Eugene is partly based on the band's lead singer, Eugene Hütz. Tom Waits, who plays Kneller in the film, also appears on the soundtrack with the song "Dead and Lovely" (from his 2004 album Real Gone) in the opening credits. Joy Division's "Love Will Tear Us Apart" and Christian Death's "Deathwish" can be heard in the background of the first bar scene of the film (both bands were fronted by singers who died by suicide), and an arrangement of "Gloomy Sunday" can be heard at a later point, songs about or associated with suicide.

Reception
As of March 2015, the film has a 67% approval rating on Rotten Tomatoes. The consensus reads, "Wristcutters: A Love Story sounds like a normal enough indie flick.  Boy meets girl.  Boy gets separated from girl.  Boy goes on a road trip with friends to find girl and gains a new perspective on life. Except everybody’s dead."  On Metacritic, it has a rating of 62/100, which the site labels as "generally favorable reviews". The film received a positive review in The New York Times, which named it a "Critics' Pick" and said in part that it "has an offbeat, absurdist charm that turns a potentially creepy concept into an odd, touching adventure."

Awards
 Independent Spirit Award for Best First Screenplay – Nominee
 Independent Spirit Award for Best First Feature – Nominee
 2006 Sundance Film Festival – Grand Jury Prize – Nominee
 Seattle International Film Festival Awards – Best Director – Won
 Gen Art 2006 – Best Feature Film – Won
 Philadelphia Film Festival 2006 – Best First Feature – Won
 Humanitas Prize 2006 – Best Screenplay – Nominee
 Motovun Film Festival 2006 – Best Film Audience Award – Won
Sundance Screenwriter's Lab selection

References

External links
 
 
 

2006 films
2006 fantasy films
2006 independent films
2006 romantic comedy films
Films based on short fiction
Films about dreams
American black comedy films
American LGBT-related films
American romantic comedy films
American romantic fantasy films
2000s Russian-language films
Films about suicide
Films shot in California
Films shot in Los Angeles
Heaven and hell films
American independent films
American road movies
2000s road movies
Lionsgate films
Films about depression
Fiction about purgatory
2006 directorial debut films
2000s English-language films
2000s American films